Beginners is the third studio album by American musician Christian Lee Hutson. It was released on May 29, 2020 under Anti-.

Critical reception
Beginners was met with "generally favorable" reviews from critics. At Metacritic, which assigns a weighted average rating out of 100 to reviews from mainstream publications, this release received an average score of 78, based on 6 reviews.

Track listing

References

2020 albums
Anti- (record label) albums
Albums produced by Phoebe Bridgers